The New Schools at Carver (formerly the George Washington Carver Comprehensive High School) is a high school in Atlanta, Georgia, United States. It is part of Atlanta Public Schools. Schools include Early College, Technology, Performing Arts, Entrepreneurship, and Health Science and Research.

The main building on the campus is Leete Hall (1922) designed by Alexander Hamilton and Henry White Jr. In 1922 this was the campus of Clark University and Gammon College. The colleges moved out of South Atlanta in 1941. The 2021-22 Carver Atlanta football team finished 12-3 and were runners up in the Class 3A state championship game, solidifying them as one of the greatest teams in APS history. They are coached by former Purdue Boilermaker Darren Myles.

References

External links
 NSC
 School of Health Sciences & Research
 School of Technology

Atlanta Public Schools high schools
Historically segregated African-American schools in Georgia (U.S. state)